The 1997 Women's Home Nations Championship was the second women's rugby union Home Championship.
It was won by England.
The tournament was again held between the four British Isles home nations, Wales, England, Ireland and Scotland.

Final table

Results

See also
Women's Six Nations Championship
Women's international rugby union

References

External links
The official RBS Six Nations Site

1997
1997 rugby union tournaments for national teams
1996–97 in Irish rugby union
1996–97 in English rugby union
1996–97 in Welsh rugby union
1996–97 in Scottish rugby union
rugby union
rugby union
1996–97 in European women's rugby union
rugby union
rugby union
Women's Home Nations
Women's Home Nations
Women's Home Nations